Alberto Urcino Méndez Gálvez (born 9 November 1961) is a Mexican politician affiliated with the National Action Party. He served as Deputy of the LIX Legislature of the Mexican Congress representing Veracruz, and previously served as municipal president of Huatusco.

References

1961 births
Living people
Politicians from Veracruz
National Action Party (Mexico) politicians
Municipal presidents in Veracruz
21st-century Mexican politicians
Deputies of the LIX Legislature of Mexico
Members of the Chamber of Deputies (Mexico) for Veracruz